Countryside refers to a rural area.  

Countryside or countrysides may also refer to:

Organizations in the United Kingdom
Countryside Agency
Countryside Alliance
Countryside Commission
Countryside Council for Wales
Countryside Live, an event at the Great Yorkshire Showground
Countryside Party (UK)
Countryside Stewardship Scheme

Places in the United States
Countryside, Illinois
Countryside, Kansas
Countryside, Virginia
Countryside High School, Clearwater, Florida
Tait–Ervin House or Countryside, a plantation near Camden, Alabama

Other uses
Countryside (Åland), a sub-region of Finland
Countrysides (album), by Cracker
Countrysides, an EP by Jonah Matranga and Mikee J Reds
"Countryside", a song by Florida Georgia Line from Life Rolls On, 2021